Pestana Group is a Portuguese tourism and leisure group. Its hotel chain Pestana Hotels and Resorts has 100 hotels with over 12,000 rooms. The group manages Pousadas de Portugal since 2003.

Organization

The firm's main activity is tourism, having also interests in industry and services. It manages hotel units in three different continents: Europe, South America, and Africa.  The countries it serves on those continents are [in alphabetical order]: Argentina, Brazil, Cape Verde, Mozambique, Portugal, São Tomé and Príncipe, and South Africa.

The Pestana Group owns the Portuguese airline euroAtlantic Airways, and a stake in STP Airways, which is the national airline of São Tomé and Príncipe.

Besides the 91 hotels, the Pestana Group has six timesharing properties, three golf courses, two real estate/touristic properties, a gambling concession for a Casino, a participation in a charter airline, a travel agency and three Tour Operators.

In 2015, Pestana Group partnered with Cristiano Ronaldo to open a hotel chain under the CR7 brand. The first hotel was opened in 2016 in Funchal, above Museu CR7, later that year another hotel was opened in Lisbon.

In 2020, Pestana Group opened its second hotel in the United States in Manhattan.

The Pestana Group owns Empresa de Cervejas da Madeira, a company in Madeira island that produces and distributes Coral, Brisa and Laranjada, some of the top-selling local alcoholic and non-alcoholic beverages.

History

The Pestana Group was founded by José Pestana and his brother Manuel Pestana, when they acquired the Atlântico Hotel in 1965. A new five-star hotel was built in its place, the work was completed in 1972. Later Jose Pestana sold his part of the business and when Manuel Pestana retired he left control of the company to his son, Dionísio Pestana.

In 2003, the Pestana Group took over the management of Pousadas de Portugal.

Gallery

References

External links
Pestana Group

Hotel chains in Portugal
Resorts in Portugal
Hospitality companies of Portugal
Hotels established in 1972
Portuguese brands